The 2021–22 Towson Tigers men's basketball team represented Towson University during the 2021–22 NCAA Division I men's basketball season. The Tigers, led by 11th-year head coach Pat Skerry, played their home games at the SECU Arena in Towson, Maryland as members of the Colonial Athletic Association.

Previous season
The Tigers finished the 2020–21 season 4–14, 3–9 in CAA play to finish in ninth place. They lost in the first round of the CAA tournament to Elon.

Roster

Schedule and results

|-
!colspan=9 style=| Non-conference regular season
|-

|-
!colspan=9 style=| CAA regular season

|-
!colspan=9 style=| CAA tournament

|-
!colspan=9 style=| NIT

|-

Source

References

Towson Tigers men's basketball seasons
Towson
Towson
Towson
Towson